Mirosław Krajewski (born 13 October 1946 in Nowiny) is a Polish politician. He was elected to the Sejm on 25 September 2005, getting 11,333 votes in 5 Toruń district as a candidate from the Samoobrona Rzeczpospolitej Polskiej list.

He was also a member of Sejm 2001-2005.

See also
Members of Polish Sejm 2005-2007

External links
Mirosław Krajewski - parliamentary page - includes declarations of interest, voting record, and transcripts of speeches.

Members of the Polish Sejm 2005–2007
Members of the Polish Sejm 2001–2005
Self-Defence of the Republic of Poland politicians
1946 births
Living people
Academic staff of the University of Warmia and Mazury in Olsztyn